Button's Mill was the name of a number of windmills in the United Kingdom.

Button's Mill, Diss, Norfolk
Button's Mill, Thelnetham, Suffolk